Darren McGeouch, (born 28 February 1990) is a Scottish footballer who plays as a midfielder.

Career
McGeouch started his career in Celtic's youth team before signing for Greenock Morton in 2007, choosing the Greenock side over rivals St Mirren and Kilmarnock. He stayed at the club for two seasons, making no appearances before signing with Stranraer. On 7 November 2009, McGeouch scored his first goal in senior football in a 4-2 defeat for Stranraer by English side Berwick Rangers.

McGeouch had two spells with Stranraer, the last of which ended in March 2011 when he signed for an amateur side in Falkirk. In between these two spells at Stair Park, McGeouch was not with a club due to a change in personal circumstances, but did play in a few trial matches with his local Junior club Glasgow Perthshire, and for his college side.

In the summer of 2011, his first senior club Morton re-signed the now 21-year-old midfielder.

McGeouch made his début as a second-half substitute (for Peter MacDonald) in the 8-0 Challenge Cup victory over his former side Stranraer. He was released for a second time in May 2012.

McGeouch joined Glasgow Perthshire in February 2013 before moving to Irvine Meadow the following July.

His brother, Dylan McGeouch, is also a professional footballer.

See also
2011–12 Greenock Morton F.C. season

References

External links

1990 births
Living people
Footballers from Glasgow
Scottish footballers
Celtic F.C. players
Greenock Morton F.C. players
Scottish Football League players
Scottish Junior Football Association players
Association football midfielders
Stranraer F.C. players
Glasgow Perthshire F.C. players
Irvine Meadow XI F.C. players